Adolf Klein (15 August 1847 – 11 March 1931) was an Austrian actor and theatre director. Klein appeared in around sixty films, mainly during the silent era. He appeared in a number of the epics made by the German film industry during the early 1920s such as his role as Cardinal Wolsey in Ernst Lubitsch's Anna Boleyn (1920).

Selected filmography
 Dr. Hart's Diary (1917)
 The Mirror of the World (1918)
 The Seeds of Life (1918)
 Veritas Vincit (1919)
 The Panther Bride (1919)
 The Loves of Käthe Keller (1919)
 Anna Boleyn (1920)
 The Secret of the Mummy (1921)
 Lady Hamilton (1921)
 Ilona (1921)
 The Adventuress of Monte Carlo (1921)
 The Amazon (1921)
 The Inheritance of Tordis (1921)
 The Maharaja's Favourite Wife (1921)
 The Passion of Inge Krafft (1921)
 The Women of Gnadenstein (1921)
 The Three Aunts (1921)
 Phantom (1922)
 Fridericus Rex (1922)
 The Black Cover (1922)
 Frauenmoral (1923)
 The Last Battle (1923)
Rivals (1923)
 Judith (1923)
 The Hungarian Princess (1923)
 Carlos and Elisabeth (1924)
 Strong Winds (1924)
 A Free People (1925)
 Bismarck (1925)
 Wood Love (1925)
 Shadows of the Metropolis (1925)
 Shadow of the World City (1925)
 The City of Temptation (1925)
 Maytime (1926)
 The Great Duchess (1926)
 Bismarck 1862–1898 (1927)
 1914 (1931)

References

Bibliography

External links

1847 births
1931 deaths
Austrian male film actors
Austrian male silent film actors
Austrian male stage actors
Male actors from Vienna
20th-century Austrian male actors